Julia O'Hara Stiles (born March 28, 1981) is an American actress. Born and raised in New York City, Stiles began acting at the age of 11 as part of New York's La MaMa Experimental Theatre Club. Her film debut was a small role in I Love You, I Love You Not (1996), followed by a lead role in Wicked (1998) for which she received the Karlovy Vary Film Festival Award for Best Actress. She rose to prominence with leading roles in teen films such as 10 Things I Hate About You (1999), Down to You (2000), and Save the Last Dance (2001). Her accolades include an NBR Award, a CFCA Award, a Gold Derby Award, a Teen Choice Award and two MTV Movie Awards, as well as Satellite Award, Gotham Award, Golden Globe Award, and Emmy Award nominations. 

Stiles added to her list of credits with films such as The Business of Strangers (2001), Mona Lisa Smile (2003), and The Omen (2006), and became known to audiences worldwide with her portrayal of Nicky Parsons in the Bourne franchise (2002–2016). Her other notable film credits include Hamlet, State and Main (both 2000), O (2001), A Guy Thing (2002), Carolina (2003), The Prince & Me (2004), Edmond, A Little Trip to Heaven (both 2005), The Cry of the Owl (2009), Silver Linings Playbook (2012), Out of the Dark (2014), Blackway (2015), 11:55 (2016), Hustlers (2019), and The God Committee (2021).

Outside of film, Stiles played Lumen Pierce on the fifth season of Dexter (2010), earning nominations for the Golden Globe for Best Supporting Actress and the Primetime Emmy for Outstanding Guest Actress. From 2012–14 she appeared as the titular character in the web series Blue, for which she earned two IAWTV Awards for Best Actress. From 2017 to 2020 she starred as Georgina Ryland on the Sky Atlantic series Riviera. She currently stars in the Amazon series The Lake (2022–present).

Early life
Stiles was born in New York City to parents Judith Newcomb Stiles, a Greenwich Village artist, and John O'Hara, an elementary school teacher. She is the oldest of three children; her siblings are John Junior and Jane (also an actress). Stiles is of English, Irish, and Italian descent. She started acting at age 11, performing with New York's La MaMa Theatre Company.

Career

Film career
Stiles's first film role was in I Love You, I Love You Not (1996), with Claire Danes and Jude Law. She also had small roles as Harrison Ford's character's daughter in Alan J. Pakula's The Devil's Own (1997) and in M. Night Shyamalan's Wide Awake (1998). Her first lead was in Wicked (1998), playing a teenage girl who might have murdered her mother so she could have her father all to herself. Critic Joe Baltake wrote she was "the darling of the 1998 Sundance Film Festival." She next starred in the TV miniseries The '60s in 1999.

Later that year, she portrayed Kat Stratford, opposite Heath Ledger in Gil Junger's 10 Things I Hate About You, an adaptation of The Taming of the Shrew set in a high school in Tacoma, Washington. She won an MTV Movie Award for Breakthrough Female Performance for the role. The Chicago Film Critics voted her the most promising new actress of the year. Her next starring role was in Down to You (2000), which was panned by critics, but earned both her and her co-star Freddie Prinze, Jr. a Teen Choice Award nomination for their on-screen chemistry. She subsequently appeared in two more Shakespearean adaptations. The first was as Ophelia in Michael Almereyda's Hamlet (2000), with Ethan Hawke in the lead. The second was in the Desdemona role, opposite Mekhi Phifer, in Tim Blake Nelson's O (2001), a version of Othello set at a boarding school. Neither film was a great success; O was subject to many delays and a change of distributors, and Hamlet was an art house film shot on a minimal budget.

Stiles next commercial success was in Save the Last Dance (2001) as an aspiring ballerina forced to leave her small town in downstate Illinois to live with her struggling musician father in Chicago after her mother dies in a car accident. At her new, nearly all-black school, she falls in love with the character played by Sean Patrick Thomas who teaches her hip-hop dance steps that help get her into the Juilliard School. The role won her two more MTV awards for Best Kiss and Best Female Performance and a Teen Choice Award for best fight scene for her battle with Bianca Lawson. Rolling Stone named her "the coolest co-ed" and put her on the cover of its April 12, 2001, issue. She told Rolling Stone that she performed all her own dancing in the film, though the way the film was shot and edited might have made it appear otherwise.

In David Mamet's State and Main (2000), about a film shooting on location in a small town in Vermont, she played a teenage girl who seduces a film actor (Alec Baldwin) with a weakness for teen girls. Stiles also appeared opposite Stockard Channing in the dark art house film The Business of Strangers (2001) as a conniving, amoral secretary who exacts revenge on her boss. Channing was impressed by her co-star: "In addition to her talent, she has a quality that is almost feral, something that can make people uneasy. She has an effect on people." Stiles also had a small role as Treadstone operative Nicolette "Nicky" Parsons in The Bourne Identity (2002), a role that was enlarged in The Bourne Supremacy (2004), then greatly expanded in The Bourne Ultimatum (2007).

Between the Bourne films, she appeared in Mona Lisa Smile (2003) as Joan, a student at Wellesley College in 1953, whose art professor (Julia Roberts) encourages her to pursue a career in law rather than become a wife and mother. Critic Stephen Holden called her one of cinema's "brightest young stars", but the film met with generally unfavorable reviews. Stiles played a Wisconsin college student who is swept off her feet by a Danish prince, played by Luke Mably, in The Prince and Me (2004), directed by Martha Coolidge. Stiles told an interviewer that she was very similar to her character Paige Morgan. Critic Scott Foundas said she was "irrepressibly engaging" and the film was a "strange career choice for Stiles". This echoed criticism in reviews of A Guy Thing (2003), a romantic comedy with Jason Lee and Selma Blair. Critic Dennis Harvey wrote that Stiles was "wasted" and Holden called her "a serious actress from whom comedy does not seem to flow naturally". In 2005, Stiles was cast opposite her Hamlet co-star Liev Schreiber in The Omen, a remake of the 1976 horror film. The film was released on June 6, 2006. She returned to the Bourne series with a much larger role in The Bourne Ultimatum (2007), her highest-grossing film to date.

Stiles began filming Between Us in May 2011 with co-stars Taye Diggs, David Harbour, and Melissa George. Between Us is the screen adaptation of the off-Broadway play of the same name by Joe Hortua. In 2012, Stiles starred alongside David Cross and America Ferrera in the dark comedy It's a Disaster. The film premiered at the Los Angeles Film Festival and was picked up by Oscilloscope Laboratories and received a commercial release in April 2013. Stiles had a small but pivotal role as a reporter in the 2013 British-American film Closed Circuit. In April 2013, it was announced that Stiles would be starring in the indie supernatural thriller Out of the Dark alongside Scott Speedman and Stephen Rea. Filming began in Bogotá, Colombia.

In 2015, Stiles signed on to reprise her role as Nicky Parsons in Jason Bourne, the fifth installment of the Bourne franchise. She also featured as Courtney, the wayward mother of Sophie Nélisse, in The Great Gilly Hopkins, which premiered in U.S. cinemas on October 7, 2016.

In 2019, Stiles appeared in the movie Hustlers as the journalist, Elizabeth. The film opened on September 13, 2019, and became a box office success.

Stage career
Stiles's first theatrical roles were in works by author/composer John Moran with the group Ridge Theater in Manhattan's Lower East Side from 1993 to 1998. From July to August 2002, she performed on stage in Eve Ensler's The Vagina Monologues, and appeared as Viola, the lead role in Shakespeare in the Park's production of Twelfth Night with Jimmy Smits.

In 2004, she made her London stage debut opposite Aaron Eckhart in a revival of David Mamet's play Oleanna at the Garrick Theatre. She reprised the role of Carol in a 2009 production of Oleanna, directed by Doug Hughes and co-starring Bill Pullman at the Mark Taper Forum. The production moved to Broadway's John Golden Theatre for October 11 opening night.

Stiles was to play Jeannie in a production of Neil LaBute's Fat Pig directed by the playwright beginning in April 2011, but the show was postponed indefinitely.

Other work
Stiles appeared in the video for Cyndi Lauper's single "Sally's Pigeons" in 1993. On March 17, 2001, she hosted Saturday Night Live and eight days later she was a presenter at the 73rd Academy Awards. She returned to Saturday Night Live on May 5 appearing as then-President George W. Bush's daughter Jenna Bush in a skit that poked fun at the two first daughters for being arrested for underage drinking. MTV profiled her in its Diary series in 2003, and she was Punk'd by Ashton Kutcher at a Washington, D.C., museum in 2004.

Stiles made her writing and directorial debut with Elle magazine's short Raving starring Zooey Deschanel. It premiered at the 2007 Tribeca Film Festival.

In May 2010, Stiles was cast in a major role in the Showtime series Dexter and signed for 10 episodes. For this role, she received a nomination for the Golden Globe Award for Best Supporting Actress – Series, Miniseries or Television Film, as well as a Primetime Emmy Award for Outstanding Guest Actress in a Drama Series.

In June 2012, the web series Blue premiered. It stars Stiles as a single mother with a 13-year-old son. She works at an office and also as a call girl to make ends meet on an otherwise meager income fighting to protect her son from the collision between her complicated past and tenuous present. For her work on Blue, Stiles won two IAWTV Awards, in 2013 and 2014. The actress during the recordings shared set with artists like Michelle Forbes, JC Gonzalez, and Uriah Shelton.

In 2021, it was announced that Stiles was cast as Maisy-May in the Canadian Amazon Prime series The Lake. Maisy-May is the "picture-perfect" stepdaughter/stepsister who was given the family cottage by her stepfather, to the dismay of her stepbrother Justin. The series was shot in North Bay, Ontario in August and September 2021. Season 1 was released on June 17, 2022.

Personal life
Stiles graduated from Columbia University with a degree in English literature in 2005. In college, she dated actor Joseph Gordon-Levitt and the two lived in John Jay Hall. She and actor David Harbour were in a relationship between 2011 and 2015. In 2010, she received a John Jay Award, an annual honorary award given to five alumni by the Columbia College Alumni Association for professional achievements.

Stiles has also worked for Habitat for Humanity, building housing in Costa Rica, and has worked with Amnesty International to raise awareness of the harsh conditions of immigration detention of unaccompanied juveniles. In January 2004, Marie Claire featured Stiles's trip to see conditions at the Berks County Youth Center in Leesport, Pennsylvania.

Stiles is a former vegan, occasionally eating red meat. She says she gave up veganism after she developed anemia and found it difficult to get proper nutrition while traveling. She has described herself as a feminist and wrote about the subject in The Guardian.

She is a fan of baseball and the New York Mets. She threw the ceremonial first pitch before their May 29, 2006, game.

In September 2017 Stiles married camera assistant Preston J. Cook with whom she worked on Blackway. On October 20, 2017, their son Strummer Newcomb Cook was born. In January 2022, Stiles gave birth to a boy named Arlo.

Filmography

Film

Television

Theme park attractions

Internet

References

External links

Julia Stiles on Instagram

1981 births
Living people
Actresses from New York City
American child actresses
American film actresses
American people of English descent
American people of Irish descent
American people of Italian descent
American Shakespearean actresses
American stage actresses
American television actresses
Columbia College (New York) alumni
Feminist artists
People from Manhattan
20th-century American actresses
21st-century American actresses